The following is a list of mayors of Aix-en-Provence, France.

See also 
 Timeline of Aix-en-Provence

Aix-en-Provence